

The Park Avenue Armory Conservancy, generally known as Park Avenue Armory, is a nonprofit cultural institution within the historic Seventh Regiment Armory building located at 643 Park Avenue on New York City's Upper East Side. The institution displays unconventional artwork, including performing and visual arts.

Park Avenue Armory leased the building for 99 years from New York State in 2006.

Arts programs 
The Armory's first three years of artistic programming presented work in partnership with other cultural institutions such as Lincoln Center and the Whitney Museum of American Art before launching its first solo exhibitions with Ernesto Neto's anthropodino in 2009 and Christian Boltanski’s No Man's Land in 2010. The Armory then engaged consulting artistic director Kristy Edmunds to develop its first two full artistic seasons for 2011 and 2012. The 2013 season was curated by the incoming artistic director Alex Poots.

In 2020, The Park Avenue Armory invited 10 New York City cultural institutions to commission 100 women artists to create new work that celebrates the ratification of the 19th Amendment. The program will be known as "100 Years | 100 Women". Minerva a portrait of Minerva was commissioned from Elizabeth Colomba. This is the first work by a Black artist in the Armory

Renovation of the Seventh Regiment Armory 
The conservancy completed a $200 million renovation of the building. Park Avenue Armory hired the architectural firm Herzog & de Meuron to design the restoration and renovation of the building with executive architects Platt Byard Dovell White.

References

External links
 
 Park Avenue Armory Documentary produced by Treasures of New York
 Under Construction feature in an episode from the American Theatre Wing's documentary series Working in the Theatre

Art museums and galleries in Manhattan
Upper East Side